Ernest Stanley (27 September 1926 – August 2006) was an English cricketer. He played for Essex between 1949 and 1952.

References

External links

1926 births
2006 deaths
English cricketers
Essex cricketers
People from Leyton